Marhemetabad Rural District is in the Central District of Miandoab County, West Azerbaijan province, Iran. At the National Census of 2006, its population was 11,746 in 2,933 households. There were 10,327 inhabitants in 3,006 households at the following census of 2011. At the most recent census of 2016, the population of the rural district was 10,072 in 3,097 households. The largest of its 33 villages was Gug Tappeh-ye Khaleseh, with 2,548 people.

References 

Miandoab County

Rural Districts of West Azerbaijan Province

Populated places in West Azerbaijan Province

Populated places in Miandoab County